Signal Rock is a 2018 Filipino independent drama film produced and directed by Chito S. Roño, starring Christian Bables together with an ensemble cast. The film was produced by CSR Productions and distributed by Regal Entertainment on August 15, 2018 which serves as the official entry to the Pista ng Pelikulang Pilipino. It was selected as the Philippine entry for the Best Foreign Language Film at the 91st Academy Awards, but it was not nominated.

Based on a true story and set in 1990s, the film follows Intoy (Bables), as he takes care of his family in Biri, Samar while his sister is in the overseas, only to contact her using strange rock formations in the island.

Premise
The story follows Intoy (Bables) who lives with his family in Biri, Northern Samar while his sister Vicky works in Finland. Vicky marries a foreigner believing that it will solve their financial problems. In order to contact his sister, Intoy must scramble about the strange rock formations in the island to attain signal, as is it the only location where he can do so. Intoy experiences conflict due to his love for a woman who will soon leave for Manila, his duty in the island, and his ambitions, which include leaving the island for work. Traditionally, women leave the island, while the men stay.

Cast
 Christian Bables as Intoy Abakan
 Daria Ramirez as Alicia Abakan
 Nanding Josef as Jamin Abakan
 Mon Confiado as Damian
 Elora Españo as Rachel
 Keanna Reeves as Gloria
 Francis Magundayao as Bong
 Archie Adamos as Mario
 Sue Prado as Loida 
 Jomari Umpa as Kiko
 Ces Quesada as Chona
Kokoy De Santos as Gabs
 Judy Ann Santos as Vicky Abakan
 Mara Lopez as Gina
 Ruby Ruiz as Mila
 Dido dela Paz
 Arnold Reyes as Joaquin
 Menggie Cobarrubias as Mayor
 Joel Saracho
 JayR Versales
 Lee O'Brian as Finnish Consul

Awards and nominations

Ratings 
According to the Movie and Television Review and Classification Board (MTRCB), due to several foul language, mature theme, and some sex scenes, only audiences eighteen (18) years old and above can view this well crafted film (Director's Cut). The MTRCB classified the film as rated R-18.

See also
List of submissions to the 91st Academy Awards for Best Foreign Language Film
List of Philippine submissions for the Academy Award for Best Foreign Language Film

References

External links
 

2018 films
Philippine drama films
2018 drama films